Navneet Aditya Waiba is an Indian Nepali-language folk singer and the daughter of the late Hira Devi Waiba, the pioneer of Nepali folk music. Navneet and younger brother Satya Aditya Waiba (producer/manager) are the only artists in the Nepali folk music genre who sing and produce authentic traditional Nepali folk songs without adulteration or modernisation using mostly organic and traditional Nepali music instruments.

Early life 
Navneet Aditya Waiba was born to mother Hira Devi Waiba and father Ratan Lal Aditya, and was raised in the hill town of Kurseong in Darjeeling, West Bengal, India. Both Nanveet and Satya grew up in a musical environment owing to their mother and grandfather Sri Singh Man Singh Waiba who also happened to be their mother's musical mentor/coach.

Education and previous career 
Navneet obtained her Master of English (MA) degree from North Bengal University, West Bengal, India. She worked as a senior flight purser with Cathay Pacific Airlines, Hong Kong.

Musical career

Team 
Satya Aditya Waiba, her brother produces and manages the music whilst the Kutumba band from Kathmandu give music to the songs.

Musical journey 
After the death of mother Hira Devi Waiba in 2011, Navneet and Satya teamed up and began work to revive, protect and popularise authentic traditional Nepali Folk Music thus keeping the family's age old generational musical legacy alive. Their songs mostly reflects on women's issues, conflicts and difficulties in the Nepali society.

The brother and sister duo re-arranged and re-recorded Hira Devi Waiba's songs and in 2015 they handpicked Hira Devi Waiba's most iconic and popular songs. They named the album 'Ama Lai Shraddhanjali - Tribute to Mother' and released it on 3 November 2017 at the historic venue, Patan Museum in Kathmandu, Nepal.

"I would like to inspire the younger generation to go back to the roots we belong to. I feel that the songs will bring back those memories." -Navneet Aditya Waiba

Discography

Album

Singles 

 Bari Lai
 Dhiki Kuti
 Tin Dang Tin Dhang Madal Bajyo
 Udho Jada

See also 
 Ama Lai Shraddhanjali - Music album
 Hira Devi Waiba

Further reading 
 आमाको गीत गाएर नवनीतले नचाइन् कालेबुङलाई
Navneet Aditya Waiba- A Nepali Folk Singer
 Navneet Aditya Waiba album
 हिरादेवी वाइवाका गीतलाई पुनर्जीवन

References

External links 

 Waiba's YouTube channel
 Waiba's Facebook page
 Waiba's Instagram page

Singers from West Bengal
Nepali-language singers from India
People from Darjeeling district
21st-century Indian women singers
21st-century Indian singers
Women musicians from West Bengal
Indian women folk singers
People from Darjeeling
20th-century Indian women singers
Tamang-language singers
Musicians of Indian descent
20th-century Indian singers
Folk musicians
Nepalese folk singers
Tamang people